Anju Bhargava is a management consultant who was a member of President Barack Obama's inaugural Advisory Council on Faith Based and Neighborhood Partnership.

Work 
Bhargava began her career as a banker and has held senior-level positions in corporate America, focusing on global business transformation, organizational development, and risk management, including credit and operational risk. Her research on super-regional bank Llan's loss experience was published by The RMA Journal, and received recognition from the Office of the Comptroller of Currency. She worked with Rutgers Business School as a Fellow of Department of Accounting, Business Ethics and Information Systems on risk assurance and Enterprise Risk Management issues. She has held senior positions at Bank of America, Bear Stearns, BB&T Bank, IBM Global Services, Fleet/NatWest Bank and Chase Manhattan Bank. She has developed the executive executive education program Chakravyuhu, also known as the Labyrinth, a program for mentoring women in India and the U.S. to make the "step change" in their careers in the global corporate world. She previously taught organizational management at Rutgers Graduate School of Business.

Shortly after her appointment to the President's Inaugural Advisory Council in April 2009, Bhargava founded a progressive American organization advancing sevā, interfaith collaboration, pluralism, social justice and sustainable civic engagement to ignite grassroots social change and build healthy communities.

As the only member of eastern tradition on the council, she brought to the White House more awareness of the issues facing the Dharmic community. She saw a need for greater integration of America's cultural and religious diversity and leveraging their skills to strengthen America domestically and globally. Hence, along with the Council recommendations, with the HASC team, she wrote a community assessment report “Call to Serve” and presented it to the President and Senior Administration officials. This became a strategic and visionary road map for integration of the Hindu community to make service and volunteering a defining part of Hindu/Dharmic American life and culture. The overall goal is to increase civic engagement, to increase and promote volunteering, and foster interfaith collaboration while addressing the nation's needs. She developed tools for a faith-based, in-culture approach to development for the Hindu/Dharmic community to serve, such as UtsavSeva. This approach has received widespread support from key spiritual leaders, including the Dalai Lama, Sri Sri Ravi Shankar, Amma, ISKCON, Chinmaya Mission and others.

Bhargava played a key role in co-hosting 3 historic conferences with the White House:
(1) Energizing Dharmic Seva: Impacting Change in America and Abroad” (July 29–31, 2011),
(2) Strengthening Dharmic Places of Worship (April 20,2012) and
(3) “Dharmic American Future: Seva, Innovation and Tradition" (August 3–4, 2012).

Bhargava is currently on the board of trustees of:
1. Council for a Parliament of the World’s Religions, and
2. Odyssey Network.

Bhargava serves on the Department of Homeland Security’s Faith-based Advisory Council and assists the President's Interfaith Campus Challenge (Department of Education).

Bhargava frequently blogs for the Huffington Post and the Washington Post. She is a frequent speaker at many forums, including The Conference Board, Universities, Corporations, Risk & Regulation.

Prior Community Building Experience 
Bhargava was the only Indian-American to serve in the Community Builder Fellowship, President Clinton's White House initiative (1998–2000). During this time, she conducted the 1st study of Asian American immigrants needs in New Jersey which became the foundation for many government and community organizations programs (2000). She was an advisor to Community Foundation NJ which brought diverse parents (the New Americans) in Elizabeth and Jersey City together to breakdown cultural barriers. She educated diverse communities on HUD programs and worked to identify ways to empower communities, increase affordable housing and homeownership, reduce homelessness, promote jobs and economic opportunity and fight for fair housing. She was recognized by the Partnership for New Jersey and Governor Whitman as a founder of New Jersey Diversity Network.

Anju Bhargava attended the 1st briefing of Asian Women in 1983, President Reagan's White House initiative. With Asian Indian Women in America and the City of New York, Bhargava played a key role in co-organizing the 1st job fair for underserved communities in 1986.

She advised Livingston Township, Board of Education, Clergy in developing diversity and inclusion strategies to integrate global, multicultural residents while enhancing the Township's image and resulting property values. She has organized community-based affinity groups (the first networking forum for South Asians in Corporate America – 1988–1995) and has created a language and cultural education infrastructure to facilitate adaptation and integration. In 2006, she initiated Utsava, the 1st Festival of India in Winston-Salem, North Carolina, an event linked with Winston-Salem's strategic direction to revitalize downtown and enhance bio-science workforce development, and with North Carolina's global education vision and goals for school children. The Indian community provided an inculture, first hand, global education to the people of Winston-Salem; the world in America. She was a founding member of NJ Corporate Diversity Network, an initiative formed with Partnership for New Jersey to "maximize effectiveness of diversity initiatives to enhance business results and positively affect our communities and the economy".

Recognition 

In 2012 Bhargava was invited to the White House.

Bhargava was one of 10 Inspiring Women Religious Leaders published by the Huffington Post. (She blogs for Huffington Post and Washington Post).

Education 
Bhargava is a graduate of Stella Maris College, Madras University, India, Rutgers University (MBA), with training at Harvard's Kennedy School of Government, American University, and Kellogg.

References

Living people
American political consultants
Harvard Kennedy School alumni
Indian emigrants to the United States
Stella Maris College, Chennai alumni
Rutgers University alumni
Year of birth missing (living people)
21st-century American women
American businesspeople
American people of Indian descent